American Handball Championship may refer to:

 Pan American Men's Handball Championship
 Pan American Women's Handball Championship